Suryapura, also spelled Surajpura, is a village and corresponding community development block in Rohtas district of Bihar, India. As of 2011, the village of Suryapura had a population of 6,347, in 900 households, while Suryapura block had a population of 57,529, in 8,728 households. It is the least populous of Rohtas's 19 blocks.

Demographics 

Suryapura is a rural block, with no large urban centres. The sex ratio of Suryapura block was 918 as of 2011, which was equal to the Rohtas district average (although slightly below the rural average of 921 for the district). The ratio was slightly higher among the 0-6 age group, with 928 females for every 1000 males. The gender distribution in Suryapura itself was 3,331 male and 3,016 female. Members of scheduled castes constituted 15.46% of the population (somewhat lower than the district average), while members of scheduled tribes made up 0.2% (also lower than the district average). The literacy rate of Suryapura block was 72.06%, which was slightly below the district average of 73.37% (72.50% in rural areas). Literacy was higher in men than in women, with 82.98% of men but only 60.13% of women able to read and write, resulting in a 22.85% gender literacy gap (higher than the overall district average of 19.91% as well as the rural average of 21.04%).

Employment 
Most people in Suryapura block were engaged in agriculture in 2011, with 35.72% of the workforce being cultivators who owned or leased their own land, and a further 39.62% being agricultural labourers who worked someone else's land for wages. 4.86% of the workforce was engaged in household industries, and the remaining 19.80% were classified as "other workers".

Amenities 
All 40 inhabited villages in Suryapura block have access to drinking water, although only 3 of them have tap water, Suryapura itself among them. 28 villages have schools, serving 90.3% of the block's population, and 12 have medical facilities, serving 46.58%. 24 villages have telephone service, serving 74.2% of the block's residents, and 32 have electrical power, serving 92.26%.

Narayanpur village in Suryapura block has large electric power station supplying power to not only Suryapura block but  a large area within Rohtas district and neighbouring districts.

Five villages have banks and agricultural credit societies, 13 have transport communications (rail, bus, or navigable waterways), and 20 have permanent pucca roads. Narayanpur village of Suryapura block has Canara Bank branch, formerly Syndicate Bank serving customers from within Suryapura block and nearby areas for decades.

Land use 
Suryapura block covers an area of 5,723.24 hectares; of this total area, 85.45% is cultivable. Of the cultivable area, 75.42% was irrigated. In the village of Suryapura itself, there are 150.6 hectares of farmland.

Villages 
In total, there are 48 villages in Suryapura block, including Suryapura itself. 40 of these are inhabited and the remaining 8 are uninhabited.Narayanpur is a prominent village of Suryapura block situated on National Highway 120, nearly 6 km from subdivisional headquarter of Bikramganj.

Narayanpur village of Suryapura block is highly developed compared to other villages of Suryapura block.

References 

Villages in Rohtas district